Thrall is a ghost town in Greenwood County, Kansas, United States.

History
A post office opened in Thrall in 1885, closed in 1905, reopened in 1926, and reclosed in 1962.

Geography

References

Further reading

External links
 Greenwood County maps: Current, Historic, KDOT

Unincorporated communities in Greenwood County, Kansas
Unincorporated communities in Kansas
Ghost towns in Kansas